Images of Canada was a Canadian documentary television miniseries which aired on CBC Television occasionally from 1972 to 1976.

Premise
This series examined various aspects of Canadian history.

Episodes

1972-73
 21 March 1972: "The Craft of History" (George Robertson producer) - host Ramsay Cook discussed aspects of Canadian history with Michel Brunet, Donald Creighton and Arthur R. M. Lower
 28 March 1972: "The Folly on the Hill" (Vincent Tovell director) - featured Ottawa's Parliament Buildings, noting their history and design
 21 February 1973: "Heroic Beginnings" (Donald Creighton narrator and director) - featured various historical locations such as Dawson City, Yukon and an Atlantic Viking community

"The Whitecomers"
Five of the episodes were grouped "The Whitecomers", three of which aired in 1973 and the remainder in 1974.

 28 February 1973: "The Magic Circle" (Carol Myers director) - concerned New France between 1600 and 1867
 7 March 1973: "Ties That Bind" (John Labow director) - concerned Atlantic Canada's history
 14 March 1973: "Peace, Order, and Prosperity" (Carol Myers director) - featured the history of the Upper Canada region between 1776 and 1900
 21 March 1973: rebroadcast of "The Follow on the Hill"
 28 March 1973: rebroadcast of "The Craft of History"

1974
 18 February 1974 - Donald Creighton reviews Canada's expansion
 25 February 1974 - Portrait of New France 1600-1867
 4 March 1974 - "Ties that Bind the Maritimes", Atlantic history from 1600 to 1867
 11 March 1974 - "Upper Canada 1700-1900"
 18 March 1974 - "The Promised Land", part of the Whitecomers sub-series, concerning the Prairies
 25 March 1974 - "Spendour Undiminished", part of the Whitecomers sub-series, about British Columbia

1976

Two special episodes were broadcast in 1976:

 6 April 1976 "Journey Without Arrival: A Personal Point of View From Northrop Frye" - the author and academic discusses Canadian identity and attitudes, discussing art and history in scenes recorded at various Canadian locations.
 27 October 1976 "Spirit in a Landscape: The People Beyond" (Carol Myers director, Barbara Moon writer) - features Inuit art and culture. This episode was broadcast in three languages: English for CBC, French for Radio-Canada and Inuktitut for CBC's Northern Service.

Scheduling
The first season of this hour-long series was broadcast on Tuesdays at 10:00 p.m. on 21 and 28 March 1972.

In 1973, the season consisted of four new episodes plus repeats of the two episodes from the first season, seen on Wednesdays at 9:30 p.m. from 21 February to 28 March 1973.

Images of Canada'''s third and final season aired Mondays at 10:00 p.m. from 18 February to 25 March 1974.

Episodes were rebroadcast on various Sundays during mid-1977 and mid-1979. Excerpts from the series were later seen in the Canadian School Telecasts'' broadcasts.

References

External links

 

 
CBC Television original programming
1972 Canadian television series debuts
1976 Canadian television series endings
1970s Canadian documentary television series